Rangi Ruru Girls' School is a New Zealand private girls' day and boarding secondary school located in Merivale, an inner suburb of Christchurch. The school is affiliated to the Presbyterian Church, and serves approximately  girls from Years 7 to 13 (ages 10 to 18).

History 

The school was founded in 1889 when Frederick Gibson bought a school run in Papanui by friends of his, Ada, Kate and Jessie Gresham, who were moving to Australia. The school had 18 students, aged 5 to 16 years old. Initially Gibson's daughters Alice and Helen and their mother Mary ran the school, calling it "Miss Gibson's Private School for Girls". In 1891 the school moved to a building in Webb Street and was renamed Rangi Ruru, meaning "wide sky-shelter". This name had been suggested by a Māori chief of Rapaki Pa, Pāora Taki, a friend of Frederick Gibson. Helen Gibson continued as Principal and her sisters Alice, Ethel, Ruth and Winifred joined as teachers. The school prospered under Helen Gibson's leadership, and grew to over 200 students at the time of her death in 1938. From 1938 until the sale of the school in 1946, Ethel Gibson was principal; her sisters continued to assist and support her.

The school moved to its present site in 1923, as the Webb Street building was becoming too small. Te Koraha, the original house on the site, had been the home of the Rhodes family; it was made available to the Duke and Duchess of Cornwall and York for their June 1901 royal visit to Christchurch.

The Rangi Ruru Board of Governors was established in 1946 when Presbyterian Church members purchased the school from the Gibson family. While the Christchurch Presbytery approves appointments, the board is autonomous.

In the early 1980s the school wanted to have an on-site chapel, while simultaneously the congregation of St. Andrew's Presbyterian Church at Hospital Corner was declining. It was decided to relocate the church to the school site, and in 1986 the building was moved to land adjacent to the school on Merivale Lane. The church became known as "St Andrew's at Rangi Ruru".

Academic achievement
Rangi Ruru is consistently one of New Zealand's highest-achieving schools in academic achievement.

In 2013, 100 percent of girls leaving Rangi Ruru held at least NCEA Level 1, 98.2 percent held at least NCEA Level 2, and 92.0 percent held at least University Entrance. This is compared to 86.8%, 77.2%, and 55.4% respectively for girls nationally.

Notable alumnae

Sophie Devine (born 1989), cricket and hockey player
Elizabeth Edgar (born 1929), botanist
Sophia Fenwick (born 1992), netball player
Kenneth Gresson (1891–1974), soldier, lawyer, university lecturer and judge (attended before Rangi Ruru became a girls' school)
Eve MacFarlane (born 1992), rower
Elizabeth Manu (born 1986), netball player
Annabel Ritchie (born 1978), lawyer and rower
Francie Turner (born 1992), rowing cox
Polly 'PJ' Harding (born 1990), radio host

References

External links

1968 photo of St Andrew's Church, i.e. prior to its relocation

Educational institutions established in 1889
Girls' schools in New Zealand
Intermediate schools in New Zealand
Secondary schools in Christchurch
Boarding schools in New Zealand
1889 establishments in New Zealand
Alliance of Girls' Schools Australasia